Arthur B. Krim (4 April 1910 – 21 September 1994) was an American entertainment lawyer, the former finance chairman for the U.S. Democratic Party, an adviser to President Lyndon Johnson and the former chairman of Eagle-Lion Films (1946–1949), United Artists (1951–1978), and Orion Pictures (1978–1992). His more than four decades as a movie studio head is one of the longest in Hollywood history.

Biography
Born to a Jewish family in New York City, he received his B.A. from Columbia University in 1930, and graduated from Columbia Law School two years later.

Krim was a partner at the firm of Phillips Nizer Benjamin Krim & Ballon. He worked as an entertainment lawyer for clients such as Clifford Odets and John Garfield.

He served in the Army Service Forces in the Pacific Theatre of Operations where he rose to the rank of lieutenant colonel.

Film
In 1946 Krim and his partner Robert Benjamin managed the American portion of Eagle-Lion Films where they sought top talent to produce their films.

When Krim and Benjamin took over United Artists in 1951, stockholders gave them three years to turn a profit; they did it in six months. Krim remained with UA until 1978 when he created Orion Pictures.

Democratic Party
Krim became an influential Democrat, head of the Democratic Party Financing Committee and advised Presidents John F. Kennedy, Lyndon B. Johnson and Jimmy Carter.

Personal life
He was married to Mathilde Krim. He died in New York City in 1994, aged 84.

References

External links

 
 Oral History Interviews with Arthur B. Krim, from the Lyndon Baines Johnson Library
 Arthur Krim papers, 1920 - 1990 at the Rare Book and Manuscript Library, Columbia University, New York, NY

1910 births
1994 deaths
American film studio executives
American entertainment lawyers
Jewish American attorneys
Jean Hersholt Humanitarian Award winners
Orion Pictures Corporation
Businesspeople from Los Angeles
Columbia Law School alumni
20th-century American lawyers
20th-century American businesspeople
Columbia College (New York) alumni
American independent film production company founders
20th-century American Jews